The Last U-Boat is a 1993 German television film directed by Frank Beyer, starring Ulrich Mühe and Ulrich Tukur, and scored by Oskar Sala. The film is loosely based on the true story of the German submarine U-234.

Cast
Ulrich Mühe as Kommandant Gerber
Ulrich Tukur as Röhler
Kaoru Kobayashi as Tatsumi
Goro Ohashi as Kimura
Manfred Zapatka as Beck
Matthias Habich as Mellenberg
Udo Samel as Dr. Falke
Sylvester Groth as Maschke
Barry Bostwick as Captain Hawkins
Andrew Wilson as Grant

References

External links

1992 films
1992 television films
Films directed by Frank Beyer
German television films
1990s German-language films
German-language television shows
Japan in non-Japanese culture
World War II submarine films
1990s German films
ZDF original programming